Yaacov Agam (born 11 May 1928) is an Israeli sculptor and experimental artist widely known for his contributions to optical and kinetic art.

Biography
Yaacov Gibstein (later Agam) was born in Israel, which, at that time was called Mandate Palestine. His father, Yehoshua Gibstein, was a rabbi and a kabbalist.

Agam trained at the Bezalel Academy of Art and Design in Jerusalem, before moving to Zürich, Switzerland in 1949, where he studied under Johannes Itten (1888–1967) at the Kunstgewerbe Schule, and was also influenced by the painter and sculptor Max Bill (1908–1994).

In 1951 Agam moved to Paris, France, where he still lives.

Artistic career
Agam's first solo exhibition was at the Galerie Craven, Paris, in 1953, and he exhibited three works at the 1954 Salon des Réalités Nouvelles
and at the Le Mouvement exhibition at the Galerie Denise René, Paris, in 1955. 

Agam's work is usually abstract, kinetic art, with movement, viewer participation and frequent use of light and sound. His works are placed in many public places. His best-known pieces include Double Metamorphosis III (1965), Visual Music Orchestration (1989), the fountain at the La Défense district in Paris (1975) and the Fire and Water Fountain in the Dizengoff Square in Tel Aviv (1986). He is also known for a type of print known as an "Agamograph", which uses barrier-grid animation to present radically different images, depending on the angle from which it is viewed. The lenticular technique was executed in large scale in the  square "Complex Vision" (1969), mounted on the facade of the Callahan Eye Foundation Hospital in Birmingham, Alabama.

Agam had a retrospective exhibition in Paris at the Musée National d'Art Moderne in 1972, and at the Guggenheim Museum in New York in 1980, among others. His works are held in numerous museum collections including the Museum of Modern Art and the Mildred Lane Kemper Art Museum.

He is the subject of two 20th century documentary films by American filmmaker Warren Forma: Possibilities of Agam (1967) and Agam and... (1980).

In 1996, he was awarded the Jan Amos Comenius Medal by UNESCO for the "Agam Method" for visual education of young children.

He designed and created the winner's trophy for the 1999 Eurovision Song Contest that was held in Jerusalem.

In 2009, at age 81, Agam created a monument for the World Games in Kaohsiung, Taiwan titled Peaceful Communication with the World. It consists of nine 10m high hexagonal pillars positioned in a rhomboid formation. The sides of the pillars are painted in different patterns and hues..

One of Agam's more notable creations is the Hanukkah Menorah at the corner of Fifth Avenue and 59th Street in New York City, sponsored by the Lubavitch Youth Organization. The 32-foot-high, gold colored, 4,000-pound steel structure is recognized by the Guinness Book of World Records as the "world's largest Hanukkah menorah".

In May 2014, Agam's piece Faith- Visual Pray was presented to Pope Francis by El Al Israel Airlines's president, David Maimon. The piece included significant symbols of both Jewish and Christian faiths.

Agam's work commands the highest prices of any Israeli artist. In a Sotheby's New York auction in November 2009, when his 4 Themes Contrepoint was sold for $326,500, he said: "This does not amaze me … my prices will go up, in keeping with the history I made in the art world."

In 2018, the Yaacov Agam Museum of Art (YAMA) opened in the artist's hometown of Rishon LeZion, Israel. Agam told the Jerusalem Post that it is "the only museum in the world that is dedicated to art in motion."

See also
 Visual arts in Israel
 List of public art in Israel

References

Bibliography

External links

 
 
 
 
 

Living people
People from Rishon LeZion
Jews in Mandatory Palestine
Israeli Jews
Jewish sculptors
Modern painters
20th-century Israeli sculptors
Contemporary sculptors
Jewish artists
Jewish Israeli artists
Bezalel Academy of Arts and Design alumni
Sandberg Prize recipients
Op art
1928 births